The Next Bihar Legislative Assembly election is speculated to be held on or before October–November 2025 to elect all 243 members of the state's Legislative Assembly.

Background 
The previous assembly elections were held in October–November 2020. After the election, National Democratic Alliance formed the state government, with Nitish Kumar becoming Chief Minister.Later, In August 2022 Nitish Kumar led JD(U) snap ties with NDA and formed government with RJD led Mahagathbandhan. 
Tejashwi Yadav is the CM Candidate for RJD-JD(U) led Mahagathbandan.

Schedule

Parties and alliances





Others

See also 

 Elections in Bihar
 Politics of Bihar

References

State Assembly elections in Bihar
2020s in Bihar